StarBase is a database for decoding miRNA-mRNA,  miRNA-lncRNA, miRNA-sncRNA, miRNA-circRNA, miRNA-pseudogene, protein-lncRNA, protein-ncRNA, protein-mRNA interactions, and ceRNA networks from CLIP-Seq (HITS-CLIP, PAR-CLIP, iCLIP, CLASH) and degradome sequencing data. StarBase provides miRFunction and ceRNAFunction web tools to predict the function of ncRNAs (miRNAs, lncRNAs, pseudogenes) and protein-coding genes from the miRNA and ceRNA regulatory networks. StarBase also developed Pan-Cancer Analysis Platform to decipher Pan-Cancer Analysis Networks of lncRNAs, miRNAs, ceRNAs, and RNA-binding proteins (RBPs) by mining clinical and expression profiles of 14 cancer types (including more than six thousand samples) from The Cancer Genome Atlas (TCGA) Data Portal.

See also
 MicroRNA and microRNA target database
 MicroRNA
 Degradome sequencing

References

External links
 http://starbase.sysu.edu.cn/
 https://web.archive.org/web/20110222111721/http://starbase.sysu.edu.cn/

Genetics databases
RNA
MicroRNA